Old Main, the former Nicholas County High School, is a school building located in Summersville, West Virginia.  The two-story stone Renaissance-style building was constructed in 1913 and graduated its first class in 1915.

From 1915 to 1930, the school also served as the site of a State Normal School for teachers.  The school was eventually replaced by the current Nicholas County High School, which is located on a separate campus north of Summersville. Summersville Junior High School occupied the site afterwards, until a new site for SJHS behind NCHS was completed.

The Old Main building was added to the National Register of Historic Places on March 27, 1989.

References

Defunct schools in West Virginia
H. Rus Warne buildings
Renaissance Revival architecture in West Virginia
School buildings completed in 1913
Schools in Nicholas County, West Virginia
School buildings on the National Register of Historic Places in West Virginia
National Register of Historic Places in Nicholas County, West Virginia
1913 establishments in West Virginia